The Noise is the 20th studio album by the English singer and songwriter Peter Hammill.

As the title implies, the album is a collection of uptempo rock songs, in sharp contrast to Hammill's previous album, Fireships, which consisted mainly of ballads.  The album was announced on its sleeve as "Number 1 in the A Loud series" (Fireships had similarly been labelled as "Number 1 in the BeCalm series").  At the time, Hammill intended these labels to continue, and to separate his loud and quiet songs between different albums.  The idea did not, however, continue beyond these two albums.

The song "Primo on the Parapet" is a tribute to the writer and Holocaust survivor Primo Levi, and has been performed many times by Hammill in concert.

Track listing
All tracks composed by Peter Hammill
"A Kick to Kill the Kiss"
"Like a Shot, the Entertainer"
"The Noise"
"Celebrity Kissing"
"Where the Mouth Is"
"The Great European Department Store"
"Planet Coventry"
"Primo on the Parapet"

Personnel
Peter Hammill – vocals, guitar, keyboards
Manny Elias – drums
Nic Potter – bass
John Ellis – guitar
David Jackson – saxophone, flute

Technical
Peter Hammill - recording engineer, mixing (Terra Incognita, Bath)
Paul Ridout - cover design

References

Peter Hammill albums
1993 albums